Jolt is a 2021 American action comedy film directed by Tanya Wexler and written by Scott Wascha. The film stars Kate Beckinsale, Bobby Cannavale, Laverne Cox, Stanley Tucci, and Jai Courtney. It was released on July 23, 2021, by Amazon Studios.

Plot
An ex-bouncer, Lindy Lewis (Kate Beckinsale) suffers from intermittent explosive disorder, which is triggered by interactions with people. She has been seeing a psychiatrist, Dr. Ivan Munchin, who has been attempting to treat her disorder with an electroshock vest, which is slowly becoming less effective. He advises that she try forming a relationship with someone as another path to treatment. Against her better judgement, she goes on a date with an accountant named Justin, with whom she gets on very well. Just before their next date, she discovers he has been murdered. After the police seem indifferent to his killing, she goes on a hunt for the killer. She steals his belongings from the police station, and escapes from Detectives Vicars and Nevin in Justin's McLaren 600LT Spider, ending in a crash which puts Vicars in the hospital. She uses Justin's phone to discover who he had been working for, which leads her to an arms dealer, who after interrogation tells her it was his boss, Gareth Fizal.

She tells the police of the information she has uncovered, and Vicars give her Fizal's location, but Nevin tries to stop her. She escapes Nevin and travels to Fizal's office building, where the head of security, Delacroix, detains her and confiscates her vest before releasing her. Delacroix informs Fizal, who asks for Lindy to be dealt with, while Lindy goes to see her psychiatrist to be provided with another electroshock vest. While she is there her home is boobytrapped with explosives, but she disarms them and takes them with her, setting her own explosion in her apartment to make Delacroix and Fizal believe they have been successful. Lindy then attempts to break into Fizal's building, but is found by Delacroix and taken to see Fizal, who admits to having had many people killed. She is again detained by Delacroix who attempts to kill her by exsanguination, but she escapes and uses Delacroix's own equipment to torture him to find out how to access Fizal's office. She fights her way through security to get back to Fizal's office, where she finds he is already dead - shot in the head by Justin, who reveals himself to be a CIA agent who had faked his death to use Lindy to kill Fizal, having paid for Munchin's research. Justin attempts to kill her by electrocuting her with her own vest, but she has become immune to its effects from overuse, and she uses the explosives taken from her apartment to kill Justin.

Lindy returns to Dr. Munchin, who admits that he had been doing as Justin had said. Vicars and Nevin arrive to find Lindy holding Munchin at gunpoint against the wall. Assuming she is trying to kill him, they shoot her in the leg, but they discover she was handcuffing him to hand over to them. In hospital after receiving treatment, Vicars asks Lindy on a date. After leaving the hospital Lindy returns to her burnt out apartment and is met by a mysterious woman, who tells her she was a superior to both Munchin and Justin and tries to convince Lindy to join her.

In a mid-credits scene, a hacker who helped Lindy break into Justin's phone discovers that Lindy's payment to her - a set of keys - is to the Justin's car.

Cast

 Kate Beckinsale as Lindy Lewis
 Bobby Cannavale as Detective Vicars
 Laverne Cox as Detective Nevin
 Stanley Tucci as Dr. Ivan Munchin
 Jai Courtney as Justin
 David Bradley as Gareth Fizel
 Ori Pfeffer as Delacroix
 Susan Sarandon as Narrator

Production
In April 2019, it was announced Kate Beckinsale had joined the cast of the film as the lead, with Tanya Wexler directing from a screenplay by Scott Wascha. In July 2019, Bobby Cannavale, Laverne Cox, Stanley Tucci and Jai Courtney joined the cast of the film.

Principal photography began in July 2019. Per the credits, filming took place in Bulgaria and the United Kingdom.

Release
The film was released on July 23, 2021, on Amazon Prime Video.

Reception
On Rotten Tomatoes the film holds a 40% approval rating based on 77 reviews, with an average rating of 4.90/10. The site's critical consensus reads, "In spite of a crackling premise and a star who's always ready for action, Jolt never manages to deliver much more than a mild buzz". On Metacritic, the film holds a rating of 48 out of 100, based on review from 16 critics, indicating "mixed or average reviews".

Bob Strauss of The San Francisco Chronicle gave the film 2.5 out of 5 stars writing: "While it's not always as sharp as it could be, the energy in "Jolt" never falters, and there are definitely amusing bits." Leslie Felperin of The Guardian gave the film 3 out of 5 stars writing: "Kate Beckinsale’s furious heroine is electrically entertaining". Calum Marsh of The New York Times gave the film a negative review writing: "The plot, stretched thin even at just 90 minutes, is extremely predictable, and therefore boring, and the film doesn't do enough with its high-concept shock-therapy conceit to feel fresh or novel." Tomris Laffly of RogerEbert.com also gave the film a negative review giving the film two stars writing: "An action-packed, sci-fi adjacent dark comedy that leaves a lot to be desired in its neon-soaked wake."

References

External links
 

2021 films
2021 action comedy films
2020s English-language films
Amazon Studios films
American action comedy films
Films directed by Tanya Wexler
Films scored by Dominic Lewis
Amazon Prime Video original films
2020s American films